Ædes Danielis, sometimes known as Palazzo Gregorio Bonici, is a late 17th century renaissance building with a private garden in Żejtun, Malta. It is a historic private property built by Gregorio Bonici as his secondary residence, and is now owned by the descendants of the Bonici and Testaferrata families.

History
Ædes Danielis is a 17th-century country-house, built in 1659 as a secondary residence for the nobleman Gregorio Bonici (1612-1697). Bonici was one of the donors of the land where the parish church now stands. Bonici was a successful trader in the wheat industry and occupied some of the highest civilian positions in Malta. In fact, he was the castellan of Mdina during the reign of Grandmaster Lascaris.

Gregorio Bonici had offered the land in front of Aedes Danielis to build a larger parish church for the locality but, owing to criticism for being distant from some villagers, it was then decided to alternatively donate other land. The family had no children but, similar to other well-to-do families, owned slaves who took care of the household. Two of the slaves were given their freedom after they convinced their owner of their conversion to Christianity and by marrying them to men he approved. His favourite among the former slaves was Angela who was permitted to take Bonici as her surname. She was given freedom and allowed to get married, living a normal life. She and her husband named their son Daniel, who became a priest thanks to a prerequisite sum of money for priesthood donated by Gregorio.

Following the death of Gregorio Bonici, his childless wife (Elena Barbara) inherited his assets, including the building which remained her residence until her death three years later. The building later passed to other members of the Bonici family who intermarried with the Testaferrata family, and eventually with the Moroni Viani family. 

The garage at the back of the property was used as a massive storage for the decorations of the feast of the village, until around WWII. The building was requisitioned by the British army during WWII to be used by servicemen stationed in the area. The garden, forming part of the property, was directly hit by enemy aerial bombing on 11 May 1941, at around 9pm, just before sunset. The nobility was abolished around 1974.  

Undenied word of mouth has it that Bonici's brother, Daniele Bonici, was buried alive after being sexually abused by priests in Birgu. Daniele was 14 years at the time of his death - he served as an altar boy and following the abuse the priests opted for a way to seal their criminal deeds. The building is claimed to be named after him, but it is more likely to have been named for the niche of Prophet Daniel, which is centrally located on the main façade.

The building and its chapel were robbed extensively in two separate occasions - once in January 1980 and again in August 1981. In June 1999, Maria Testaferrat Bonici died and she left in her will all the belonging to her three children a third each, including the building. The heirs mentioned in the will are Agnes Gera de Petri, Annamaria Spiteri Debono, and Caren Preziosi. The building was eventually divided into several residences, with different door numbers for the family members.

The building is mentioned as an official address in the Paradise Papers. The building is also known as Palazzo Aedes Danielis and Aedes Danielis Palace, however the words palazzo or palace are redundant as the Latin word ‘aedes’ means house. It is known by some locals as the il-Palazz tal-Markiża.

Architecture
The building goes back to the renaissance, originally as a country residence, and is today a landmark welcoming visitors on one of the main streets to the city of Żejtun. The façade is imposing on its surrounding environment. The building, with its ancillary structures and gardens, is a scheduling property as published on the Government Gazette of Malta of July 2009.

A large religious niche, with an imposing life size statue of biblical Prophet Daniel, is a prominent feature on the façade. The statue is one of only two statues in Malta which are representative of an Old Testament personage. The face of the statue is associated to that of Gregorio Bonici as depicted on a painting located at the Parish Church. The niche is adorned with inscriptions, including dates, and other architectural elements, such as lions’ heads and a coat-of-arms. The latter is a listed national monument. 

Adjoining the building is a chapel which is dedicated to the Our Lady of Good Counsel. It was built in 1768 to a Baroque design and financed by Enrico Testaferrata. This forms part of the private property and is sometimes opened to the public. The chapel is separately listed as a national monument.

See also
Casa Perellos

References

Bibliography

Books

Magazines

Journals

News

Court cases

Tribunal cases

Online

Reports

Other

Further reading

External links
Aedis Danielis - PlakkaStorja
Aedis Danielis Palace Jigsaw Puzzle

Żejtun
National Inventory of the Cultural Property of the Maltese Islands
Renaissance architecture in Malta
Limestone buildings in Malta
World War II sites in Malta
Buildings and structures completed in 1660
Houses in Malta